Darrell Ell is a Canadian curler and curling coach from Lethbridge, Alberta.

He is a long-time coach of Canadian and European teams, and later on was coach of the Netherlands and Hungarian national teams at the World and European championships.

From 2011 to 2021 he worked for World Curling Federation as Competitions and Development Officer.

Teams

Record as a coach of national teams

References

External links
 
 

 Darrell Ell - Lethbridge Curling Club
 Video: 

Living people
Canadian male curlers
Canadian curling coaches
Year of birth missing (living people)
Place of birth missing (living people)
Curlers from Alberta
Sportspeople from Lethbridge
21st-century Canadian people